The Men's trap event at the 2010 South American Games was held on March 22 and March 23 at 9:00.

Individual

Medalists

Results

Qualification

Final

Team

Medalists

Results

References
Qualification
Final
Team

Trap M